Bankole A. Johnson, DSc, MD, MPhil, FRCPsych (born 5 November 1959) is a licensed physician and board-certified psychiatrist throughout Europe and the United States who served as Alumni Professor and Chairman of the Department of Psychiatry and Neurobehavioral Sciences at the University of Virginia. Johnson's primary area of research expertise is the psychopharmacology of medications for treating addictions, and he is well known in the field for his discovery that topiramate, a gamma-aminobutyric acid (GABA) facilitator and glutamate antagonist, is an effective treatment for alcoholism. Professor Johnson also received national media attention for his appearance in the Home Box Office (HBO) original documentary feature, "Addiction", which won the prestigious Governors Award, a special Emmy Award, from the Academy of Television Arts and Sciences.  Professor Johnson recently accepted an appointment to join the University of Maryland as the Chairman of Psychiatry and to lead a Brain Science Research Consortium in the neurosciences.

Biography 
Johnson was born on 5 November 1959 in Nigeria. Johnson attended King's College in Lagos, Nigeria and received his diploma in 1975. He then went on to Davies' College in Sussex, England followed by the Institute Catholique de Paris in Paris, France. Johnson graduated from the University of Glasgow in Scotland in 1982 with a Medicinae Baccalaureum et Chirurgie Baccalaureum degree. He went on to train in psychiatry at the Royal London and Maudsley and Bethlem Royal Hospitals, and to train in research at the Institute of Psychiatry (University of London). In 1991, Johnson graduated from the University of London with a Master of Philosophy degree in neuropsychiatry. Johnson conducted his doctoral research at Oxford University and obtained a doctorate degree in medicine, Medicinae Doctorem, from the University of Glasgow in 1993. Most recently, in 2004, Johnson earned his Doctor of Science degree in medicine from the University of Glasgow – the highest degree that can be granted in science by a British university.

Johnson joined the faculty at the University of Texas Health Science Center in Houston in 1993 and later became the Deputy chairman for Research and Chief of the Division of Alcohol and Drug Addiction in the Department of Psychiatry at the University of Texas Health Science Center in San Antonio in 1998. In 2001, Johnson received the Dan Anderson Research Award from the Hazelden Foundation for his "distinguished contribution as a researcher who has advanced the scientific knowledge of addiction recovery." In 2002, Johnson received the Distinguished Senior Scholar of Distinction Award from the National Medical Association. Johnson was inducted into the Texas Hall of Fame in 2003 for his contributions to science, mathematics, and technology. On 1 September 2004, Johnson accepted an appointment to serve as Alumni Professor and Chairman of the Department of Psychiatric Medicine at the University of Virginia. Johnson became a fellow of the Royal College of Psychiatrists in 2007. In 2009 Johnson was named associate editor of the editorial board of The American Journal of Psychiatry, and from 2010 to 2011 he served as field editor-in-chief of Frontiers in Psychiatry.

In 2019, Johnson received the R. Brinkley Smithers award from the American Association of Addiction Medicine.

Research 
Johnson's research focus is on the neuropsychopharmacology of addiction. His work integrates the neuroscience and behavioural aspects of addiction medicine with the goal of formulating a more thorough understanding of the basis of drug-seeking behaviour and developing effective treatments. Central to his research is the role of and interaction between midbrain monoamine systems with a focus on serotonin, gamma-aminobutyric acid (GABA)/glutamate and dopamine.

Johnson's Journal of the American Medical Association (JAMA) paper, titled "Topiramate for treating alcohol dependence: a randomized controlled trial" and published in 2007, gained national and international media attention. The 14-week US multi-site clinical trial involved 371 male and female alcoholics. Those patients taking topiramate had reduced heavy drinking and showed better results with lowering cholesterol, body mass index, liver enzymes, and blood pressure than those taking the placebo. The study results were featured on Reuters, MSNBC, CBS, ABC, CNN, Fox News, USA Today, the Associated Press, and many other media outlets.

Johnson’s current research involves clinical trials and human laboratory studies, and includes neuroimaging and molecular genetics. He now incorporates neuroimaging evaluations into his drug interaction studies to identify the site-specific effects of abused drugs and to evaluate the effectiveness of potential medications for the treatment of addiction. Current studies include a clinical trial aimed at determining the effectiveness of ondansetron, a serotonin-3 antagonist, for the treatment of subtypes of alcoholics, as well as a human laboratory project trying to elucidate the effects of naltrexone and acamprosate on hepatic and renal function in alcohol-dependent individuals.

Honors and awards 
 Inductee, Texas Hall of Fame for Science, Mathematics and Technology, 2003
 Appointed to the National Advisory Council for NIH/NIDA, 2004 – 2007
 Member, Medications Development Subcommittee of NIDA's Advisory Council on Drug Abuse, 2004 – 2007
 Member, Extramural Advisory Board for NIH/NIAAA, 2004 – present
 Member, Medications Development Scientific Advisory Board for NIH/NIDA, 2005 – 2009
 American Psychiatric Association Distinguished Psychiatrist Lecturer Award, 2006 (for outstanding achievement in the field of psychiatry as an educator, researcher, and clinician)
 NIH Roadmap Consultant, 2006 – present
 Listed in "Best Doctors in America", 2007, 2009–2010
 Fellow, Royal College of Psychiatrists, 2007 – present
 Distinguished Fellow, American Psychiatric Association, 2008 – present
 American Psychiatric Association, Solomon Carter Fuller Award, 2009
 Fellow, American College of Neuropsychopharmacology, 2010 – present
 Jack Mendelson Award, NIAAA – 2013

References

External links 
University of Virginia: http://www.healthsystem.virginia.edu/internet/psychiatric/staffandfaculty/research.cfm?uva_id=bj4x&hideintro=1
The Excelsior Program: http://www.medicine.virginia.edu/clinical/departments/psychiatry/patients/excelsior
HBO Addiction Film Series: "Addiction": http://www.hbo.com/addiction/thefilm/centerpiece/618_segment_7.html
Frontiers in Psychiatry: https://web.archive.org/web/20100211141806/http://frontiersin.org/psychiatry/psychiatry/missionstatement/
 University of Maryland: https://web.archive.org/web/20151001110541/http://somvweb.som.umaryland.edu/absolutenm/templates/?a=2446&z=41

1959 births
Bipolar disorder researchers
Nigerian psychiatrists
Alumni of the University of Glasgow
Alumni of the University of London
Alumni of the University of Oxford
University of Texas at Austin faculty
University of Virginia School of Medicine faculty
Science writers
Living people
Yoruba physicians
Fellows of the Royal College of Psychiatrists
Yoruba academics
Nigerian expatriate academics in the United States
King's College, Lagos alumni